Prathamesh Dake (born 1 January 1991) is an Indian cricketer. He made his Twenty20 debut for Mumbai in the 2013–14 Syed Mushtaq Ali Trophy on 30 March 2014.

References

External links
 

1991 births
Living people
Indian cricketers
Mumbai cricketers
Cricketers from Maharashtra